The Denza 500 is a Chinese electric car produced by Denza, an joint venture between Daimler AG and partner BYD Auto. It is a "refresh" of the Denza 400 and Denza EV models previously released by the manufacturer.

Description 

A March 2018 preview report said that features include LED lamps front and back, cold weather capability, and a 9-inch infotainment touchscreen with navigation info from Baidu Maps that can also help locate charging stations. There were 112,000 such stations in China at the time. The new vehicle was to be sold at select Mercedes-Benz dealers in China.

The 2018 facelift also resulted in a restyled front fascia, rear bumper and tail lamps, an updated interior, and a name change to Denza 500. Range of the Denza 500 is said to be 451 kilometres (280 miles) measured by the NEDC standard. This is the latest version of the Denza electric car made exclusively for the Chinese market.

The battery pack of the Denza 500 was upgraded to 70 kWh from the previous 62 kWh of the Denza EV. According to Denza, the consumption is 15.9 kWh per 100 kilometres, and a range of 635 kilometres (394 miles) could be achieved. As of October 2018, prices of the Denza 500 ranges from 298,800 to 328,800 yuan.

Denza EV 

An earlier electric car from Denza was the Denza EV, which was previewed as a concept car by Denza at the 2012 Beijing Auto Show, and was further tested as a prototype during the 2013 Shanghai Auto Show. The official launch of the production car was in 2014 with a price range 369,000 yuan to 399,000 yuan (60,000 – 65,000 USD). The Denza EV is based on the same platform as the Mercedes-Benz B-Class while the electric powertrain comes from the BYD e6 electric car producing 137 kW (184 hp) with the top speed of 150 km/h (93 mph). 

The Denza EV had a range of 352 km (218 mi) when launched in 2014; in 2017, Denza had launched a 400 km (248 mi) version.

See also

BYD e6
Mercedes-Benz B-Class
Electric car
Government incentives for plug-in electric vehicles
List of electric cars currently available
List of modern production plug-in electric vehicles
New energy vehicles in China
Plug-in electric vehicle

References

External links

Denza EV Electric Car Test Drive
Denza Official Site

Production electric cars
Cars introduced in 2014
All-wheel-drive vehicles
Cars of China
Compact MPVs
2010s cars
500